A campaign medal is a military decoration which is awarded to a member of an armed force who serves in a designated military operation or performs duty in a geographical theater. Campaign medals are very similar to service medals but carry a higher status as the award usually involves deployment to a foreign region or service in a combat zone.

History 

Campaign medals were first invented to recognize general military service in war, in contrast to meritorious decorations which were only issued on a small scale for acts of heroism and bravery. The campaign were first issued by the British military with the medal awarded for the defeat of the Invincible Armada, with the 1815 Waterloo Medal being the first awarded to all men present and the 1847 Military General Service Medal being the first "modern" campaign medal.

Campaign medals by country
 Australian campaign medals
 British campaign medals
 Canadian campaign medals
 Malaysian campaign medals
 NATO Medal refers to a number of campaign medals
 New Zealand campaign medals
 Philippines campaign medals
 Polish campaign medals
 South African campaign medals
 South Korean campaign medals
 Soviet campaign medals
 Spanish campaign medals
 Sri Lankan campaign medals
 United Nations Medal refers to a number of campaign medals
 United States campaign medals are included in Awards and decorations of the United States military

Other campaign related items
 Battle honour / Campaign streamer
 Medal bar / Campaign clasp

References

Military awards and decorations